The Royal University for Women (RUW) in West Riffa, Bahrain is the first private, purpose-built, international university in the country that is dedicated solely to educating the women.  Established in 2005, the initial degree programmes of the university were designed in collaboration with McGill University in Canada and  Middlesex University in the United Kingdom.  Among the courses offered by the university are Bachelor of Arts degrees in fashion design, graphic design, and interior design; Bachelor of Science degree in architecture; as well as Bachelor of Law and Bachelor of Business degrees in banking and finance, human resources, international business, and marketing .

Faculties
The Royal University for Women has five constituent colleges:
College of Art and Design
College of Business and Financial Sciences.
College of Engineering
College of Law
College of Information Technology

References

Universities in Bahrain
Education in Bahrain
Educational institutions established in 2005
2005 establishments in Bahrain